The 1994–95 Football League season was the 96th completed season of The Football League. It was the third season of The Football League since the formation of the Premier League. For sponsorship reasons, the league was known as the Endsleigh League.

Overview
The reduction of the Premier League from 22 teams to 20, to take effect from the 1995–96 season, meant that just two teams would be promoted from the First Division in 1995: the champions and the play-off winners. Middlesbrough were the champions, in their first season under Bryan Robson. Reading finished second but had to settle for the play-offs, losing in the final to Bolton Wanderers – who achieved their second promotion in three years under Bruce Rioch, as well as finishing runners-up to Liverpool in the League Cup.

1995 also saw four teams relegated from the First Division, with Burnley, Bristol City and Notts County being joined by Swindon Town, who suffered a second straight relegation. Sunderland narrowly avoided the drop following the arrival of enthusiastic new manager Peter Reid, who over the next few years would bring dramatic improvements to the fortunes of the Wearsiders.

The Second Division would also see only the champions and the play-off winners promoted, while five teams would be relegated. Birmingham City were the champions, returning to the First Division at the first time of asking; they also won the Football League Trophy to complete a "lower-league Double". Huddersfield Town were the play-off winners, defeating second-placed Brentford on penalties before beating Bristol Rovers in the final. The five teams relegated were Cambridge United, Plymouth Argyle, Cardiff City, Chester City and Leyton Orient.

In the Third Division, three teams would be promoted instead of the usual four: the champions, the runners-up and the play-off winners. Carlisle United were the champions and Walsall the runners-up, while Chesterfield won the play-offs, defeating Bury in the final. Exeter City, in severe financial trouble, finished bottom, but held on to their league status as Conference champions Macclesfield Town were unable to meet the league's stadium capacity requirements.

Final league tables and results 

The tables and results below are reproduced here in the exact form that they can be found at The Rec.Sport.Soccer Statistics Foundation website, with home and away statistics separated. Play-off results are from the same website.

First Division 

With the reduction of the Premier League from 22 to 20 clubs for the 1995–96 season, there would be just two promotion places from Division One in the 1994–95 season, as well as a fourth relegation place instead of the usual three. 

Middlesbrough clinched the division's only automatic promotion place by finishing champions in their first season under player-manager Bryan Robson, with promotion being clinched in the final game at Ayresome Park at the end of April. After 92 years at their historic home, the club would be relocated to the new 30,000-seater Riverside Stadium over the summer of 1995. 

Runners-up Reading, another club planning to build a new stadium in the near future, would normally have won automatic promotion, but the latest restructuring of the league meant that they had to navigate a play-off semi-final with fifth-placed Tranmere Rovers. They easily overcame the Wirral side, whose veteran striker John Aldridge topped the Division One goal charts with 24 league strikes, but then had to take on Bolton Wanderers in a Wembley clash. The Royals were still 2–0 ahead and looking set to reach the top flight for the first time ever with more than hour left on the clock, but then Bolton pulled a goal back in the 75th minute and followed this with an equaliser to force extra time, and the Burnden Park side ended up winning a dramatic match 4–3 and ending their 15-year absence from the top flight. However, they were faced with having to fight for Premier League survival in 1995–96 without their manager Bruce Rioch, who left to manage Arsenal over the summer and was succeeded by joint managers Roy McFarland and Colin Todd.

A number of Division One sides enjoyed memorable runs in the FA Cup and League Cup. Weeks before their dramatic playoff triumph, Bolton Wanderers had travelled to Wembley for their first major cup final in 37 years, to take on Liverpool in the final of the League Cup, but lost 2–1 to the Merseysiders. Wolves, who went on to lose to Bolton in the playoff semi-finals, had held Crystal Palace to a 1–1 draw in their FA Cup quarter-final at Selhurst Park and had high hopes of a semi-final tie with Manchester United, only to lose the replay 4–1 at home to the South London side. 

At the other end of the table, Swindon Town quickly found themselves battling against a second successive relegation, having been relegated from the Premier League in 1993–94. Their manager John Gorman was sacked in November and replaced by 33-year-old Manchester City midfielder Steve McMahon as player-manager. The Wiltshire club's new manager was able to guide Swindon to the semi-finals of the League Cup, but he was unable to guide them to Division One survival, as they went down in the fourth and final relegation place along with Burnley, Bristol City, and Notts County.

During this season, a number of Division One clubs had a new stadium in the pipeline. Middlesbrough were preparing for their move from Ayresome Park to the new Riverside Stadium, while their local rivals Sunderland had identified a former colliery site on the banks of the River Wear as their preferred site for a new all-seater stadium after nearly 100 years at Roker Park. Bolton Wanderers, who went up alongside Middlesbrough, were aiming for a new 25,000-seater stadium at Lostock to replace Burnden Park. Beaten playoff finalists Reading had lined up a site on the southern side of the town as the site of a replacement for antiquated Elm Park, while Luton Town's new owner Simon Kohler unveiled ambitious plans to build a new 20,000-seater indoor stadium, the latest in a string of proposals which had emerged over the last 40 years as possible replacements for the cramped stadium at Kenilworth Road. 

Derby County, who missed out on the playoffs, were planning to rebuild the Baseball Ground as a 26,000-seater stadium, after considering relocating to a new site at Pride Park.

Play-offs

Results

Top scorers

Locations

Second Division 
Following relegation from Division One at the end of the 1993–94 season, Birmingham City earned an instant return as Second Division champions, also lifting the Auto Windscreens Shield. The latest restructuring of the league meant that runners-up Brentford missed out on automatic promotion and had to contest the play-offs, where they were beaten on penalties by Huddersfield Town after drawing both legs of their semi-final 1-1. The other semi-final saw Bristol Rovers overcome Crewe Alexandra, ending the Cheshire club's chances of a second successive promotion. The Wembley showdown saw Huddersfield Town beat the West Country side 2–1 to clinch a return to the second tier after seven seasons of trying, rounding off a fine first season at Huddersfield's impressive new all-seater McAlpine Stadium. 

Wycombe Wanderers finished sixth in Division Two and missed out on the play-offs – and the chance of a third successive promotion – but this didn't deter Norwich City (just relegated from the Premier League) from recruiting Martin O'Neill as their new manager. 

At the bottom of the table, Leyton Orient were relegated after six seasons in the third tier, having not won an away game in the league since before Christmas 1993. Just before the end of the season, the Brisbane Road club was taken over by Barry Hearn, who was swift to sack joint managers John Sitton and Chris Turner, appointing Pat Holland in their place. Chester City suffered an instant return to Division Three as they finished second from bottom. Cardiff City went down to Division Three just two seasons after winning promotion. Plymouth Argyle, promotion contenders a season earlier, went down in 21st place. The fifth and final relegation place went to a Cambridge United side who had been on the brink of a place in the new Premier League just three years earlier.

As Huddersfield were settling into their new home after more than 80 years at Leeds Road, a number of other Division Two clubs were planning to follow the growing trend of moving to a completely new stadium. Just before Christmas, Bristol Rovers announced plans to build a new 20,000-seater stadium at Avonmouth as part of their ambitious plan to end their long search for a permanent new home which had started when they moved out of their home at Eastville in 1986. Blackpool were also looking at possible sites to build a new all-seater stadium to replace Bloomfield Road. Shortly after the end of the season, Oxford United announced plans to build a new 16,000-seater stadium near Blackbird Leys to replace the dilapidated Manor Ground.

Play-offs

Results

Top scorers

Locations

Third Division 
Under the ambitious ownership of Michael Knighton, the man who had unsuccessfully tried to take over Manchester United in 1989, Carlisle United clinched the Division Three title by a comfortable margin, ending their eight-year tenure in the league's basement division. Walsall, under new manager Chris Nicholl, achieved promotion as runners-up after five seasons at this level. Chesterfield ended their six-year spell in the fourth tier by triumphing over Bury in the playoff final, while the previous season's finalists Preston North End were beaten by the Greater Manchester club in the semi-final, and Mansfield lost to their East Midlands rivals Chesterfield in the other semi-final.

At the bottom end of the table, Exeter City not only found their league status under threat, but also their very existence. The Devon club, relegated from Division Two the previous season, went into liquidation in November and were only saved from going under when a takeover deal was approved. They still finished bottom of the league, level on points with Scarborough, but were saved from dropping into the Conference by the fact that Macclesfield Town's Moss Rose ground did not meet Football League requirements.

Northampton Town, whose league status had been saved in similar fashion the previous season, were on the move to a new stadium in October when they bade farewell to the County Ground and moved into the new Sixfields Stadium. 

As the season ended, three Division Three clubs had their future secured by takeover deals. Preston North End were taken over by local heating firm Baxi, who were quick to replace John Beck with Gary Peters as manager. Debt-ridden Gillingham were saved from the threat of closure by new owner Paul Scally, who appointed Tony Pulis as manager of Kent's only current Football League club. Wigan Athletic were taken over by JJB tycoon Dave Whelan, a former Blackburn Rovers player, who appointed John Deehan as the club's new manager and had plans to build a new all-seater stadium to replace Wigan's current home at Springfield Park.

Play-offs

Results

Top scorers

Locations

See also
1994–95 in English football

References

 
English Football League seasons
2